A kite  a tethered heavier-than-air or lighter-than-air craft with wing surfaces.

Kite or kites may also refer to:

 Kite (bird), the common name for a number of birds of prey
 Kite (geometry), a quadrilateral with reflection symmetry across a diagonal

Arts and entertainment

Fictional characters
 Kite (.hack), from the video game series
 Kite, a Hunter × Hunter character
 Kite,  in the TV series Extraterrestrial

Film 
 Kite (film series), by Yasuomi Umetsu
Kite (1998 film), an original video animation
 Kite (2014 film), a live action film 
 The Kite (2003 film), a Lebanese drama
 Saranggola, or The Kite, a 1999 Filipino film 
 Kites (film), a 2010 Indian romantic action thriller
 Patang (film) ('The Kite'), a 1993 Indian film

Literature
 Kite (novel), by Melvin Burgess, 1997
 The Kite, a 1962 novel by W. O. Mitchell

Music 
 Kite (band), a Swedish synthpop duo
 "Kite" (Arashi song), 2020
 "Kite" (Kate Bush song), 1978
 Kite (Kirsty MacColl album), 1989
 Kite (Stefanie Sun album), 2001
 "Kite" (U2 song), 2000
 "Kite", a song by Nick Heyward from the 1993 album From Monday to Sunday
 "Kites" (song), by Simon Dupree, 1967
 "Kites", a song by Reks from the 2016 album The Greatest X
 "Kite Song", a song by Kevin Roth from "Faith, Hope and Anxiety", an episode of Shining Time Station

Ships
 , the name of several ships of the Royal Navy
 , a ship used in the Peary expedition to Greenland of 1891–1892
 , the name of several ships of the U.S. Navy

Other uses 
 Kite (sail), or spinnaker
 Kite (sailboat), an American sailboat design
 Kite (surname), including a list of people with the name
 Kite, Georgia, U.S., a place
 Kite, any aircraft, in RAF slang
 Kite and dart tiling, in geometry
 KITE (AM), a radio station (1410 AM) licensed to Victoria, Texas, U.S.
 KNAL (FM), a radio station in Texas (93.3 FM) licensed to Port Lavaca, U.S., call sign KITE 2001–2014
 KiTE, KGiSL Institute of Technology in Coimbatore, India
 Alpi Pioneer 300 Kite, an Italian light-sport aircraft design

See also 
 Index of kite articles
 Kiting (disambiguation)
 Kiteboarding, a sport using wind power with a large power kite
 Desert kite, a dry stone wall structure
 Kite shield a type of shield